Christ and the Canaanite Woman may refer to one of two paintings of the exorcism of the Syrophoenician woman's daughter:

 Christ and the Canaanite Woman (Carracci), a 1594-1595 painting by Annibale Carracci
 Christ and the Canaanite Woman (Preti), a c.1650 painting by Mattia Preti